Ikhtiyar al-Din ( Ikhtiyāru ’d-Dīn), meaning "appointed/ chosen of the Islamic religion/ faith/ creed". It may refer to:

Ikhtiyar al-Din Ai-Taq (fl. 1161–1165), amir in western Khurasan following the decline of the Seljuks
Ikhtiyar al-Din Hasan ibn Ghafras (died 1192), vizier of the Seljuk Sultan Kilij Arslan II
Ikhtiyaruddin Ghazi Shah (fl. 1349–1352), sultan of Sonargaon
Muhammad bin Bakhtiyar Khilji (died 1206), Afghan soldier
Malik Ikhtiyaruddin Iuzbak (fl. 1251–1257), ruler of Bengal
Ikhtiyar al-Din also known as Igder – architect to Kublai Khan

Arabic masculine given names